Manfred Ewald (17 May 1926 – 21 October 2002) served as German Democratic Republic's (GDR) Minister of Sport (1961–1988) and president of his country's Olympic committee (1973–1990). He was convicted for his role in the state-sponsored system of the use of illicit performance-enhancing drugs that increased East Germany's Olympic successes from 1972–1988.

Life

Ewald was born in Podejuch, Province of Pomerania, Weimar Germany (now Podjuchy, Poland), he was a member of the Hitler Youth, the Nazi party and, after World War II, the Socialist Unity Party (also known as the Communist Party). He was captured by the Soviet Red Army in 1944.

He was awarded the Olympic Order by the International Olympic Committee (IOC) in 1983.

In 1985, as president of the National Olympic Committee of East Germany, Ewald authored a letter to the IOC for the 90th IOC session being held in East Berlin that year.

Ewald defended his role in sports doping in his 1994 book, Ich war der Sport.

Doping 

On 18 July 2000, in Berlin, Ewald and Dr. Manfred Höppner, East Germany's top sports doctor, were convicted as accessories to "intentional bodily harm of athletes, including minors." Both received probation. During the trial, Höppner testified that they had received approval from the highest level of government.

References

External links
The (London) Independent
Britannica Online Encyclopedia 
The Guardian UK
The LA Times 
"Fistic Medicine: The Benefit & Cost of Steroids" by Matt Pitt

1926 births
2002 deaths
Politicians from Szczecin
People from the Province of Pomerania
Nazi Party members
Communist Party of Germany politicians
Members of the Central Committee of the Socialist Unity Party of Germany
Government ministers of East Germany
Members of the 4th Volkskammer
Members of the 5th Volkskammer
Members of the 6th Volkskammer
Members of the 7th Volkskammer
Members of the 8th Volkskammer
Members of the 9th Volkskammer
Free German Youth members
Hitler Youth members
German referees and umpires
German military personnel of World War II
German prisoners of war in World War II held by the Soviet Union
Recipients of the Patriotic Order of Merit (honor clasp)
Recipients of the Olympic Order